Henry Chamberlain Russell  (17 March 1836 – 22 February 1907) was an Australian astronomer and meteorologist.

Early life
Russell was born at West Maitland, New South Wales, the fourth son of the Hon. Bourn Russell and his wife Jane, née Mackreth. Russell was educated at West Maitland Grammar school and the University of Sydney, (BA, 1859).

Sydney Observatory
Russell joined the staff of the Sydney Observatory under William Scott who resigned in 1862. Russell then became acting director until 1864 until the new government astronomer, George Smalley, was appointed. On the death of Smalley on 11 July 1870<ref>
Harley Wood, 'Smalley, George Robarts (1822–1870)', Australian Dictionary of Biography, Vol. 6, MUP, 1976, pp 136–137.</ref> 
Russell became government astronomer a salary of £555 and held the position for 35 years. Russell immediately began reorganising and refurnishing the building, which he succeeded in getting considerably enlarged during the next seven years. With Robert L. J. Ellery, Russell organised an expedition to observe a total eclipse of the sun to Cape Sidmouth in 1871.
Russell prepared for the observation of the transit of Venus in 1874 for which four observing stations were equipped. Russell arranged for a band of competent observers to staff them, and the results were generally very successful; an interesting account of them was published by Russell in 1892, Observations of the Transit of Venus.

Meteorology career
Russell began to develop the meteorological side of his work, in 1877 he published a substantial volume, Climate of New South Wales: Descriptive, Historical and Tabular. In this volume some attention is given to the question of weather periodicity, on which he had written a paper in 1876. In later years he gave a great deal of attention to it. At the beginning of Russell's appointment there were only 12 observing stations in New South Wales, but before he resigned there were about 1800. There was little money for equipment, but Russell made use of available materials and designed a rain gauge which could be made at a cost of one-sixth of the imported gauges. Russell also invented various self-recording barometers, thermometers, anemometers and rain gauges. This reduced and made possible the work of his observers, almost all of whom gave their services voluntarily. In collaboration with Sir Charles Todd of South Australia, and Robert L. J. Ellery and Pietro Baracchi of Victoria, weather reporting in Australia was co-ordinated until the daily weather forecasts showed a very high percentage of accuracy. The long series of Meteorological Observations made at the Government Observatory, Sydney, published under Russell's direction contain an enormous mass of information relating to the climate of New South Wales.

Russell was interested in the study of double stars and published in 1882 Results of Double Star Measures made at the Sydney Observatory 1871 to 1881. He also gave a great deal of attention to the application of photography to astronomical work. In 1887 he attended the astrographic congress at Paris and arranged for the co-operation of the Sydney observatory. This involved the taking and measurement of 1400 photographic plates. Russell supervised the preparation of the portion of the Astrographic Catalogue undertaken by the Sydney observatory until his retirement. In 1888 he was elected president of the newly formed Australasian Association for the Advancement of Science and in 1891 became vice-chancellor of the university of Sydney, but resigned within a year on account of the pressure of his other duties. By 1893 Russell had discovered 500 new double stars. In 1903 Russell had a severe illness from which he never completely recovered. He had a year's leave of absence and resigned the position of government astronomer in 1905. Russell died at the observatory on 22 February 1907. Russell was for some years president of the Royal Society of New South Wales, was elected a fellow of the Royal Society, London, in 1886, and was created C.M.G. in 1890. Russell contributed papers to various societies, many of which appeared in the Memoirs and Monthly Notices of the Royal Astronomical Society. Others papers will be found in the Journal and Proceedings'' of the Royal Society of New South Wales, and other journals. He also took an important part in the initiation of technical education in New South Wales.

Family
Russell married Emily Jane, daughter of Ambrose Foss, who survived him with a son and four daughters.

Legacy
Russell was a conscientious and enthusiastic worker; his hours of attendance at the observatory were commonly from nine in the morning until midnight. He was an excellent mechanic and was responsible for many inventions which proved to be of great value in relation with his work. His theory of a 19 years cycle in weather periodicity could not be proved on the information available, and the same may be said of the 33 years cycle of Charles Egeson, an assistant of Russell's at the observatory. Russell's paper on the Darling River read in 1879, suggesting that vast supplies of water must be flowing at a lower level was a very interesting prediction considering that artesian water was practically unknown at the time. But, however interesting these theories may have been, the great value of Russell's efforts lies in the mass of tabulated work done by him or under his direction in astronomy and especially meteorology, which has been a mine of information for all workers in the subjects.

References

1836 births
1907 deaths
19th-century Australian astronomers
Australian meteorologists
Australian Companions of the Order of St Michael and St George
People from Maitland, New South Wales
Fellows of the Royal Society
Vice-Chancellors of the University of Sydney